Séraphine Okemba (born 3 December 1995) is a French rugby union and sevens player.

She plays fifteens rugby for Stade Francais in France. She was named in France's sevens squad that won a silver medal in Rugby sevens at the 2020 Summer Olympics. She also won a bronze medal at the 2022 Rugby World Cup Sevens in Cape Town.

References 

  
1995 births
Living people
Black French sportspeople
French female rugby union players
French rugby sevens players
Olympic rugby sevens players of France
Rugby sevens players at the 2020 Summer Olympics
Sportspeople from Dreux
Medalists at the 2020 Summer Olympics
Olympic silver medalists for France
Olympic medalists in rugby sevens
French sportspeople of Republic of the Congo descent
France international women's rugby sevens players